2013–14  Uganda Cup is the 40th season of the main Ugandan football Cup.

Overview
The competition was previously known as the Kakungulu Cup. The winner represents Uganda in the CAF Confederations Cup in 2015.

Preliminary rounds
The preliminary rounds were held in December 2013 and January 2014 and were organised on a regional basis.  Results are not available for many of the matches.

Buganda region qualifiers
The Buganda region was represented by seven teams namely Seeta Utd, Mpoma Tigers FC, Bombo Utd FC, Kampala University FC, and Synergy FC (all from the Buganda Regional League) who received byes into the 'Round of 64' while Kiggogwa FC (Mityana DFA 4th Division) and Bulo Red Stars FC (Mpigi DFA 4th Division) had to play the preliminary games.

Kampala region qualifiers
The 10 teams from the Kampala region that progressed into the 'Round of 64' were Ex-Internationals, Hope Soana, Kireka United, Stegota, Life Eternal, St Mary’s, Bweyogerere, FC Barca, Coup De Grande and finally Kamwokya United FC who reached the quarterfinals of the Uganda cup last season and were handed a bye. A team of interest is Ex-Internationals FC who are led by a host of former stars on the national team. They defeated Edgars Youth at Nakivubo on spot kicks before in the next match edging out Nateete Market 1-0 to qualify for the 'Round of 64'.

Preliminary round 1

Other results missing.

Preliminary round 2

Round of 64
The draw for the 32 matches in this round were made at FUFA house in Mengo on 31 January 2014.

Footnotes

External links
 Uganda - List of Cup Finals - RSSSF (Mikael Jönsson, Ian King and Hans Schöggl)

Ugandan Cup
Uganda Cup
Uganda Cup
2013–14 in Ugandan football
Uganda Cup